The Fisher River is a tributary of the Yadkin River in northwestern North Carolina in the United States, also draining a very small portion of southwestern Virginia.  Via the Yadkin it is part of the watershed of the Pee Dee River, which flows to the Atlantic Ocean.  According to the Geographic Names Information System, it has also been known historically as "Big Fishers River," "Fish River" and "Fishe River."

The Fisher River rises in the Blue Ridge Mountains in the southeastern extremity of Grayson County, Virginia, but flows for nearly all of its length in Surry County, North Carolina, initially southeastwardly.  Near Dobson, it collects the short Little Fisher River and turns southward to its confluence with the Yadkin River, about 3 mi (5 km) north-northeast of Boonville.

See also
List of North Carolina rivers
List of Virginia rivers

References

Rivers of North Carolina
Rivers of Virginia
Rivers of Grayson County, Virginia
Rivers of Surry County, North Carolina
Tributaries of the Pee Dee River